The 2015–16 UMass Minutemen basketball team represented the University of Massachusetts Amherst during the 2015–16 NCAA Division I men's basketball season. The Minutemen, led by eighth year head coach Derek Kellogg, played their home games at the William D. Mullins Memorial Center and were members of the Atlantic 10 Conference. They finished the season 14–18, 6–12 in A-10 play to finish in a tie for tenth place. They defeated Rhode Island in the second round of the A-10 tournament to advance to the quarterfinals where they lost to VCU.

Previous season
The Minutemen finished the 2014–15 season 17–15, 10–8 in A-10 play to finish in a three-way tie for sixth place. They lost in the second round of the A-10 tournament to La Salle.

Departures

Incoming Transfers

Incoming recruits

Recruiting Class of 2016

Roster

Schedule

|-
!colspan=9 style="background:#881C1C; color:white;"| Non-conference regular Season

|-
!colspan=9 style="background:#881C1C; color:white;"| Atlantic 10 regular Season

|-
!colspan=9 style="background:#881c1c; color:#FFFFFF;"| Atlantic 10 tournament

See also
 2015–16 UMass Minutewomen basketball team

References

UMass Minutemen basketball seasons
Umass